Various  gauge railways operate in Ukraine as common carrier, industrial railway or children's railways.

gauge common carrier
Lines in Carpathian Ukraine 
Antonivka system in West Ukraine
 Built around 1900 at the gauge of  
Central Ukraine 
 Novopoltavka railways
 Vapniarka railways, 140 km, built at the  gauge by Germany, later regauged to

gauge industry, agricultural and forest railways
Industrial, peat, sugar and forestry lines 
 Mykhailivka sugar railway, 1932–1990.
 Okhtyrka sugar railway, 56 km, 1940–1999.
 Potash industrial lines, 49 km, 1933–2003.
 Smyha peat railways
 Vygoda system, 180 km of forest railways

pioneer railways
Ten pioneer or children's railways exist in various cities.
 Dnipro pioneer railway, 2 km in the Globy Park in Dnipro, opened in 1936.
 Donetsk pioneer railway, 2 km in the Leninist Komsomol Park  in Donetsk, opened in 1972.
 Yevpatoria pioneer railway near Yevpatoria on the Crimea Peninsula, opened around 1990, abandoned.
 Kharkiv pioneer railway, 4 km in the northern part of Kharkiv, opened in 1940.
 Kyiv pioneer railway, 3 km in the Syretskij Park in Kyiv, opened in 1953.
 Lutsk pioneer railway in Lutsk, built 1952–1954.
 Lviv pioneer railway, 1,9 km in the Strijskij Park in Lviv
 Uzhhorod pioneer railway on the bank of the River Uzh in Uzhhorod, opened in 1947.
 Rivne pioneer railway, 2 km, in Rivne, opened in 1949.
 Zaporizhia pioneer railway, 9 km, between the main railway station of Zaporizhia and the River Dnieper, opened in 1972.

References

 
750 mm gauge railways in Ukraine